Birger Kildal (15 April 1849 – 13 December 1913) was a Norwegian attorney and businessman. He served as politician with the Liberal Party and was appointed District Governor in Romsdal.

Background
Kildal was born at Christiania (now Oslo), Norway. He was the son of businessman and merchant Peter Wessel Wind Kildal and his wife, Christine Marie Gotaas (1817-1900). He took his law degree in 1871 and first worked as a lawyer in Hammerfest. He later went to work in his father's various commercial and industrial  enterprises including Lilleborg Fabrikker which his father had founded in 1833.

Political career
Kildal had several cabinet posts in the cabinets of Prime Ministers Johan Sverdrup  and Francis Hagerup. He was Minister of Auditing 1884–1886, as well as head of the Ministry of Postal Affairs in 1885. later, he was a member of the Council of State Division in Stockholm 1886-1887 and 1904–1905, Minister of Justice and Minister of Labour 1887, Minister of Labour 1887–1888, Minister of Finance 1895–1898, and Minister of Finance and Minister of Auditing 1903–1904.

During  the general election in 1903, he  was elected as a representative to the Norwegian Parliament from Christiania, Hønefoss and Kongsvinger. In 1906, Kildal was appointed district governor in Romsdal and held this office until his death.

Personal life
Birger Kildal was married to Sofienlund Berger (1851-1940). They were the parents of author Arne Kildal.

References

External links
 

1849 births
1913 deaths
Politicians from Oslo
Lawyers from Oslo
Businesspeople from Oslo
Government ministers of Norway
Ministers of Finance of Norway
Ministers of Justice of Norway